Wengyik 'Weng' Yeong (1966–2007) was an American computer scientist. He is principally known for his work on the X.500, LDAP, and SNMP Internet protocols.

He also authored and edited several Internet Engineering Task Force Requests for comments (RFCs), including the original specification for LDAP.

References

1966 births
2007 deaths
Rensselaer Polytechnic Institute alumni
American computer scientists
Malaysian emigrants to the United States